Maria Gregersen (born December 21, 1983 in Århus) is a Danish fashion model. She has appeared on the covers of the magazines: Costume, Marie Claire, ELLE, Madame, and Eurowoman.

References

 

1983 births
Living people
Danish female models